Main Street station may refer to:

Canada
 Main Street station (Toronto), a subway station in Toronto, Ontario, Canada
 Main Street–Science World station, a SkyTrain station in Vancouver, British Columbia, Canada

United Kingdom
 Main Street railway station (Glasgow), in Glasgow, Scotland

United States
 Main Street station (SEPTA), in Norristown, Pennsylvania, United States
 Main Street Station Hotel and Casino and Brewery, in Las Vegas, Nevada, United States
 Alma School/Main Street station, in Mesa, Arizona, United States
 Center/Main Street station, in Mesa, Arizona, United States
 Downers Grove Main Street station, in Downers Grove, Illinois, United States
 Evanston Main Street station, in Evanston, Illinois, United States
 Flushing–Main Street (IRT Flushing Line), in Queens, New York, United States
 Flushing–Main Street (LIRR station), in Queens, New York, United States
 Mesa Drive/Main Street station, in Mesa, Arizona, United States
 Richmond Main Street Station, in Richmond, Virginia, United States
 Southeast Main Street MAX Station, in Portland, Oregon, United States
 Sycamore/Main Street station, in Mesa, Arizona, United States